He Zhi ( 264–280), courtesy name Yuangan, was an official of the state of Eastern Wu during the late Three Kingdoms period (220–280) of China. He was a younger brother of Lady He, who married Sun He, a son and former heir apparent of the first Wu emperor Sun Quan. In 264, Sun He and Lady He's son, Sun Hao, ascended the throne as the fourth and last emperor of Wu. He Zhi, as a maternal uncle of the reigning emperor, rose to a more prominent position in the Wu government. In 279, Sun Hao appointed He Zhi as Minister over the Masses when Guo Ma started a rebellion in Wu, and ordered his maternal uncle and others to lead troops to suppress the revolt. In the following year, the Jin dynasty conquered Wu, after which Sun Hao surrendered. It is not known what happened to He Zhi after the fall of Wu.

See also
 Lists of people of the Three Kingdoms

References

 Chen, Shou (3rd century). Records of the Three Kingdoms (Sanguozhi).
 Fang, Xuanling (ed.) (648). Book of Jin (Jin Shu).
 Pei, Songzhi (5th century). Annotations to Records of the Three Kingdoms (Sanguozhi zhu).

Year of birth unknown
Year of death unknown
Eastern Wu politicians
Politicians from Zhenjiang